Beautiful Intentions is the third solo album by English singer Melanie C. This is the first album release on Chisholm's self-founded label, Red Girl Records after being dropped by Virgin Records. The album was a big commercial success in Europe charting in the top 20 in Austria, Germany, Scotland, Switzerland and Portugal. It achieved Gold certifications in Germany, Austria and Switzerland and a Platinum certification in Portugal. The album saw the release of hit singles "Next Best Superstar" and "First Day of My Life" which went on to become the most downloaded song of all time in Germany. In 2006, Melanie C announced via her official website that Beautiful Intentions had outsold her previous album Reason, and was certified gold and platinum in some European countries.

Background
After the release of her previous album Reason, Chisholm was dismissed by her original record label, Virgin Records. The main reason for her being dropped was the disappointing sales of her second album "Reason". Talking about being dropped by Virgin during an interview on The Guardian, Melanie C stated that "[I had] mixed feelings. I knew that they were starting to lose faith in me, so I was actually quite relieved to go. I looked at my options and starting my own label was the most exciting thing". In the spring of 2004, she created her own independent record label, "Red Girl Records", to record and release her own projects, alongside her manager, Nancy Phillips. The name was inspired by the colours of the football Liverpool F.C., which Chisholm is supporter.

The album was Chisholm's labour of love for a year, and she previewed six tracks on her Barfly mini-tour in June 2004 before going into the studio to record the tracks. Following the release of the first single, "Next Best Superstar", the album was released on 11 April 2005 in the UK and some other countries. Later the album was re-released in some countries (with a new song—"First Day of My Life"). Chisholm stated in an Australian interview that she was pleased that Beautiful Intentions outsold Reason. Beautiful Intentions has received Gold certification in Germany and Switzerland. In Portugal, it has gone Platinum (9 weeks at number 1).

Critical reception

AllMusic editor Matthew Chisling found that the "new creative control that Melanie C had over her album broadened her horizons considerably; Melanie allowed herself to fly more freely on Intentions, giving her solo music a sharp new look. On Beautiful Intentions, Melanie C developed her style into an aggressive pop-angled album boasting heavy beats with dramatic rock swings doused in musical cyclones of energy. She borrowed qualities from other heavy-talented rock divas such as Anastacia to produce a more bombastic sampling this time around." He concluded: "The final product is simply dazzling; and Beautiful Intentions is without a doubt the strongest solo album by any of the Spice Girls. Truth be told, it was one of the strongest solo pop albums of 2005, regardless of artist." Paul Taylor from Manchester Evening News also compared the songs with Anastacia's self-titled 2004 album and called it "a much finer album than we had any right to expect."

Betty Clarke, writing for The Guardian remarked: "Released on her own, self-funded Red Girl Records label, the album is a bitter attack on her old employers. A chorus-led confection of vulnerability and hurt, its needling intent – "You'll Get Yours" and "Don't Need This" are just two titles – and aggressive pop-rock sound make it Chisholm's strongest album to date." Irish website Entertainment.ie found that "she certainly delivers these riff-laden songs with gutsy conviction, and her backing band are as tight as they come. But the overall sound has a generic, processed feel to it, and poor old Mel can't write an interesting lyric to save her life. Beautiful Intentions certainly rocks hard, but ultimately it fails to convince." Matthias Manthe from laut.de called Beautiful Intentions "a rock-solid album that doesn't compromise on chart compatibility; Sitting between the rock and pop chairs without stepping on anyone's toes. Mel C sings pleasent tunes about love and the injustices of business."

Track listing
Credits adapted from the liner notes of Beautiful Intentions.

Notes
  signifies  an additional producer

Personnel

Melanie Chisholm – vocals
Paul Gendler – guitars
Trevor Barry – bass guitar
Martin Slattery – piano
Paul Stanborough – acoustic guitar
Greg Hatwell – guitars, backing vocals
Jenni Tarma – bass guitar
Nick Nasmyth – keyboards

Richard Flack – percussion, drum programming
Vinnie Lammi – drums, percussion, additional programming
Fergus Gerrand – drums, percussion
Paul Boddy – synthesizers, programming
Peter-John Vettese – synthesizers, keyboards
Jimmy Robertson – additional programming
Clint Murphy – additional programming

Charts

Weekly charts

Year-end charts

Certifications and sales

References

Melanie C albums
2005 albums
Self-released albums
Albums produced by Greg Haver